"Rock With You" was a 2005 hit single by Belgian DJ/producer Jef "Basto!" Martens. After becoming a club hit, the single was picked by Belgian music channel TMF and popular radio stations Donna (Flanders) and Contact (Wallonia). Eventually, it topped the Belgian dance charts in February 2006. A few weeks later, "Rock With You" became Dance Smash of Dutch radio station Radio 538.

A music video was produced. The single was signed by different European labels. Among them were Ministry of Sound for the UK and Australia, Airplay Records for France and Alphabet City for Germany.

Track listings
 CD-Single
 "Rock With You" (Radio Edit) (3:33)
 "Rock With You" (Original Mix) (5:23)
 "Rock With You" (NUfrequency Remix) (7:44)
 "Smokin' Vegas" (7:56)

Charts

External links
 "Rock With You" music video on YouTube
 

2006 singles
2005 songs
Songs written by Basto (musician)